The hoary-throated spinetail (Synallaxis kollari) is a bird species in the family Furnariidae. It is found in Brazil and Guyana.

Its natural habitat is subtropical or tropical moist lowland forests. It is threatened by habitat loss.

It was formerly classified as a vulnerable species, but it was shown to be rarer than previously believed consequently it was uplisted to endangered in 2008, but it was once again shown to be rarer than previously believed and that its undergoing a marked decline, consequently it was uplisted to critically endangered in 2012.

Footnotes

References
 BirdLife International (BLI) (2008): [2008 IUCN Redlist status changes]. Retrieved 2008-MAY-23.

External links
BirdLife Species Factsheet.

hoary-throated spinetail
hoary-throated spinetail
Birds of the Amazon Basin
Birds of the Guianas
hoary-throated spinetail
Taxonomy articles created by Polbot